Muck is a 2015 American comedy horror film and the directorial debut of Steve Wolsh, who also wrote and produced the film. It had its world premiere on February 26, 2015 at The Playboy Mansion and received a limited theatrical release on March 13 of the same year, followed by a video on demand release on March 17. It stars Lachlan Buchanan, Playboy Playmate of the Year 2012 Jaclyn Swedberg, Stephanie Danielson, YouTube star Lauren Francesca, and Kane Hodder. Funding for Muck was partially raised through a successful Kickstarter campaign that raised $266,325.

Muck was planned as the first film in the trilogy, and after release another crowdfunding was launched for prequel Muck: The Feast of St. Patrick. Filming was completed in 2017, but by 2021 the follow-up was still in post-production.

Plot
After narrowly escaping from an ancient burial ground, long forgotten and buried underneath the marshes of Cape Cod, a group of friends emerge from the thick, marshy darkness, tattered and bloody, lucky to be alive. They have already lost two of their friends in the marsh, presumably dead. They stumble upon an empty Cape Cod vacation house alongside the foggy marsh and break in to take shelter. Whatever was in the marsh is still after them and, soon after one of them goes for help, the rest of the group learns that the evil in the marsh is not the only thing that wants them dead. Something worse, something more savage, is lying in wait just outside the marsh, in the house. The unlucky travelers spend their St. Patrick's Day trapped between two evils, forcing them to fight, die, or go back the way they came.

Cast
 Lachlan Buchanan as Troit
 Puja Mohindra as Chandi
 Jaclyn Swedberg as Terra
 Bryce Draper as Noah
 Lauren Francesca as Mia
 Stephanie Danielson as Kylie
 Laura Jacobs as Desiree
 Grant Alan Ouzts as Billy J. Munch
 Kane Hodder as Grawesome Crutal
 Gia Skova as Victoria Cougar
 Audra Van Hees as Miss Cape Cod 2013
 Ashley Green Elizabeth as Miss Cape Cod 2012
 Mike Perfetuo as Ned
 Matt Perfetuo as Lucky
 Victoria Sophia as Dedee
 Leila Knight as Kitty
 Victoria Meincke as Messa

Soundtrack
The Muck soundtrack features 20 original tracks, and is a mixture of rock, blues, and country. The original score was composed by Dan Marschak and Miles Senzaki.

Reception
The blatant sexuality of Muck polarized audiences and critics, but the film nevertheless received major distribution. As one reviewer put it, “against all odds” Anchor Bay Entertainment distributed the film. The independent horror film was highly anticipated and widely reviewed, including by reviewers at the Los Angeles Times, The Village Voice, Bloody Disgusting, and The Fright File.

While critics generally agreed that the overt sexuality of the film was an attempt for Muck to be "a throwback to old-school horror," reviews were mixed, as some critics found Muck’s focus on sex distracting but praised the movie's look and camerawork. Others saw the film’s scantily-clad characters as an attraction. Ain't It Cool News wrote "About as subtle as a stripper in church, don’t expect your brain to be stimulated, but other areas (specifically your guts and below) are bound to be rumbled when you wade through MUCK."

On Rotten Tomatoes, the film has a 0% approval based on 7 reviews.

References

External links
 
 

2015 films
2015 horror films
2015 comedy horror films
American supernatural horror films
Supernatural comedy films
Films set in Massachusetts
Saint Patrick's Day films
Holiday horror films
2015 directorial debut films
2010s English-language films
2010s American films